Sabre Insurance is an insurer specialising in the car insurance market. It is listed on the London Stock Exchange.

History
The company was founded by Angus Ball and Keith Morris in 1982. It was acquired by General Accident in 1996 and became part of CGU in 1998 and of Aviva in 2000 before being subject of a management buyout in 2002. Its growth has been backed by equity partner BC Partners. The company launched an initial public offering on the London Stock Exchange in December 2017.

Activities
The company specialises in the unpopular parts of the car insurance market using brands which include Go Girl, Insure2Drive and Drive Smart.

References

External links

Financial services companies established in 1982